Isaac Ng'ang'a  was an Anglican bishop in Kenya: he was Bishop of Mount Kenya Central from 2004 to 2015.

References

21st-century Anglican bishops of the Anglican Church of Kenya
Anglican bishops of Mount Kenya Central